Jean-Claude Vuithier Jr. (born 25 October 1968) is a Swiss sailor. He competed in the Star event at the 1988 Summer Olympics.

References

External links
 

1968 births
Living people
Swiss male sailors (sport)
Olympic sailors of Switzerland
Sailors at the 1988 Summer Olympics – Star
Place of birth missing (living people)